Glenurus luniger is a species of antlion in the family Myrmeleontidae. It is found in Central America and North America.

References

Further reading

 
 
 
 
 
 

Myrmeleontidae
Insects described in 1894